was a Japanese theoretical physicist, known for the Ward–Takahashi identity.

Biography
1924 Birth in Osaka
1951 B.S. Nagoya University
Fulbright Scholarships
1953 Research associate, University of Rochester
1954 D.Sc.
1955 Research associate, Iowa State University
1957 Scholar, Dublin Institute for Advanced Studies
1958 Associate Professor, Dublin Institute for Advanced Studies
1960 Professor, Dublin Institute for Advanced Studies
1968 Professor, University of Alberta
2013 Death in Edmonton

Memberships
Fellow of Royal Society of Canada
Fellow of American Physical Society
Member of Royal Irish Academy

Awards
Soryushi Medal (2003)

Bibliography
An introduction to field quantization (Pergamon, Oxford, 1968)

References

External links
Stp.dias.ie
Yukawa.kyoto-u.ac.jp
Phys.ualberta.ca

1924 births
2013 deaths
Fellows of the Royal Society of Canada
Japanese physicists
Nagoya University alumni
Theoretical physicists
Academic staff of the University of Alberta

Academics of the Dublin Institute for Advanced Studies